Ōmura Station (大村駅) is the name of two train stations in Japan:

 Ōmura Station (Hyōgo)
 Ōmura Station (Nagasaki)